Howe High School is a public high school located in Howe, Texas (USA) and classified as a 3A school by the UIL.  It is part of the Howe Independent School District located in central Grayson County just south of Sherman.  In 2015, the school was rated "Met Standard" by the Texas Education Agency.

Athletics
The Howe Bulldogs compete in the following sports - 

Cross Country, Volleyball, Football, Basketball, Powerlifting, Golf, Tennis, Track, Softball & Baseball

Band
Marching Band State Champions - 
1980(2A), 1995(2A), 1997(2A)

1981
5th place finalist

1982
2nd place finalist

1983
2nd place finalist

1986
5th place finalist

1990
3rd place finalist

1991
5th place finalist

1993
5th place finalist

1999
2nd place finalist

2001
2nd place finalist

2009
5th place finalist

2013 
10th place finalist

2017 
9th place finalist

2021
9th place finalist

References

External links
 

Schools in Grayson County, Texas
Public high schools in Texas